Eileen Walsh (born 16 April 1977) is an Irish actress.

Biography
Born and raised in Cork, Ireland, Walsh was raised in a Catholic household, and had no intention of becoming an actress, until she followed in the footsteps of her elder sister Catherine, who was also an actress, and young Eileen began to attend theatre workshops. Her first break came when, as a student, she landed the role of Runt in the stage version of Disco Pigs, which received rave reviews. Subsequent movies have included When Brendan Met Trudy, The Magdalene Sisters, and The End.

In 2008, Walsh won an award for Best Actress at the Tribeca Film Festival for her portrayal of Breda, a lonely housewife whose willpower is put to the test in the film Eden.
In 2018 she appeared in two episodes of Patrick Melrose.

Filmography

References

1977 births
Irish film actresses
Irish television actresses
Living people
People from County Cork